Zmitser is a Belarusian version of personal name Demetrius or Russian Dmitri. Notable people with the surname include:

 Zmitser Dashkevich (born 1981), Belarusian politician
 Zmitser Zhylunovich, Belarusian poet, writer, and journalist

Belarusian masculine given names